Prince Hall (1807) was an American abolitionist and leader in the free black community in Boston. He founded Prince Hall Freemasonry and lobbied for education rights for African American children. He was also active in the back-to-Africa movement.

Hall tried to gain a place for New York's enslaved and free blacks in Freemasonry, education, and the military, which were some of the most crucial spheres of society in his time. Hall is considered the founder of "Black Freemasonry" in the United States, known today as Prince Hall Freemasonry. Hall formed the African Grand Lodge of North America. Prince Hall was unanimously elected its Grand Master and served until his death in 1807.

Steve Gladstone, author of Freedom Trail Boston, states that Prince Hall—known for his role in creating Black Freemasonry, championing equal education rights, and fighting slavery—"was one of the most influential free black leaders in the late 1700s".

There is confusion about his year of birth, place of birth, parents, and marriages—at least partly due to the fact that there were numerous "Prince Halls" during this time period.

Early life 
Prince Hall was born between 1735 and 1738. His place of birth and parents are also unclear. Prince Hall mentioned in his writings that New England was his homeland. The Prince Hall Grand Lodge of Massachusetts, in its Proceedings of 1906, opted for 1738, relying on a letter from Reverend Jeremy Belknap, a founder of the Massachusetts Historical Society. Prince Hall's birthday is traditionally celebrated on September 14. Hall's early years are unclear. Historian Charles H. Wesley theorized that by age 11 Prince Hall was enslaved (or in service) to Boston tanner William Hall, and by 1770 was a free, literate man and had been always accounted as a free man. It was through William Hall that Prince learned how to process and dress leather. Inside Prince Hall author and historian David L. Gray states that he was unable to find an official historical record of the manumission. Hall, identified as able to read and write, may have been self-taught or, like other enslaved people and free blacks in New England, he may have had assistance.

Family, church, and work life 
Hall joined the Congregational Church in 1762 at 27 years of age. He married an enslaved woman named Sarah Ritchie (or Ritchery) who died  in 1769. Hall married Flora Gibbs of Gloucester in 1770. David Gray states he was married for a second time to Sylvia (Zilpha) Ward Hall. An article about Prince for Africans in America by PBS states that Prince Hall married a woman named Delia, a servant outside William Hall's household, and had a son named Primus in 1756. In his research into the life of Prince Hall and the origin of Prince Hall Freemasonry, Inside Prince Hall, author David L. Gray found that there is no record of a marriage of Prince Hall to Delia, nor record of a son, Primus.

In Boston, Hall worked as a peddler, caterer, and leatherworker, owning his own leather shop. In April 1777, he created five leather drumheads for an artillery regiment of Boston. Hall was a homeowner who voted and paid taxes.

Revolutionary War 
Hall encouraged enslaved and freed blacks to serve in the American colonial military. He believed that if blacks were involved in the founding of the new nation, it would aid in the attainment of freedom for all blacks. Hall proposed that the Massachusetts Committee of Safety allow blacks to join the military. He and fellow supporters petition compared the Intolerable Acts with the enslavement of blacks. Their proposal was declined.

England issued a proclamation that guaranteed freedom to blacks who enlisted in the British army. Once the British Army filled its ranks with black troops, the Continental Army reversed its decision and allowed blacks into the military. It is believed, but not certain, that Hall was one of the six "Prince Halls" from Massachusetts to serve during the war.

Having served during the Revolutionary War, many African Americans expected, but did not receive, racial equality when the war ended. With the intention of improving the lives of fellow African Americans, Prince Hall collaborated with others to propose legislation for equal rights. He also hosted community events, such as educational forums and theatre events to improve the lives of black people.

Freemason 

Brother Prince Hall was interested in the Masonic fraternity because Freemasonry was founded upon ideals of liberty, equality, and peace. Prior to the American Revolutionary War, Prince Hall and fourteen other free black men petitioned for admittance to the all white Boston St. John's Lodge. They were turned down. Having been rejected by colonial Freemasonry, Hall and 15 others sought and were initiated into Masonry by members of Lodge No. 441 of the Grand Lodge of Ireland on March 6, 1775. The Lodge was attached to the British forces stationed in Boston. Hall and other freedmen founded African Lodge No. 1 and he was named Grand Master.

The black Masons had limited power; they could meet as a lodge, take part in the Masonic procession on St. John's Day, and bury their dead with Masonic rites but could not confer Masonic degrees or perform any other essential functions of a fully operating Lodge. Unable to create a charter, they applied to the Grand Lodge of England. The grand master of the Mother Grand Lodge of England, H. R. H. The Duke of Cumberland, issued a charter for the African Lodge No. 1 later renamed African Lodge No. 459 September 29, 1784. The lodge was the country's first African Masonic lodge. On March 22, 1797, Prince Hall organized a lodge in Philadelphia, called African Lodge #459, under Prince Hall's Charter. They later received their own charter. On June 25, 1797, he organized African Lodge (later known as Hiram Lodge #3) at Providence, Rhode Island.

Author and historian James Sidbury said Prince Hall and those who joined him to found Boston's African Masonic Lodge built a fundamentally new "African" movement on a preexisting institutional foundation. Within that movement they asserted emotional, mythical, and genealogical links to the continent of Africa and its peoples.

After the death of Prince Hall, on December 4, 1807, the brethren organized the African Grand Lodge on June 24, 1808, including the Philadelphia, Providence and Boston lodges. African Grand Lodge declared its independence from the United Grand Lodge of England and all other lodges in 1827. In 1847 they renamed to Prince Hall Grand Lodge in honor of their founder.

Hall was considered the "father of African Freemasonry." Prince Hall said of civic activities: My brethren, let us pay all due respect to all who God had put in places of honor over us: do justly and be faithful to them that hire you, and treat them with the respect they may deserve; but worship no man. Worship God, this much is your duty as christians and as masons.

Community activism 

Prince Hall worked within the state political arena to advance the rights of blacks, end slavery, and protect free blacks from being kidnapped by slave traders. He proposed a back-to-Africa movement, pressed for equal educational opportunities, and operated a school for African Americans in his home. He engaged in public speaking and debate, citing Christian scripture against slavery to a predominantly Christian legislative body.

Education 
Hall requested that the Massachusetts Congress create a school program for black children. Hall cited the same platform for fighting the American Revolution of "Taxation without Representation."  Hall and other Black Bostonians wanted a separate school to distance themselves from white supremacy and create well-educated Black citizens. Although Hall's arguments were logical, his two attempts at passing legislation through the Massachusetts Congress both resulted in failure. Hall then started a school program for free black children out of his own home with a focus on Liberal Arts and classical education.

Speech and petition writing 
He is known for giving speeches and writing petitions. In a speech given to the Boston African Masonic Lodge, Hall stated, "My brethren, let us not be cast down under these and many other abuses we at present labour under: for the darkest is before the break of day... Let us remember what a dark day it was with our African brethren, six years ago, in the French West Indies. Nothing but the snap of the whip was heard, from morning to evening".

A 1788 petition to the Massachusetts legislature protested the abuse and kidnapping of fellow Black Boston residents, and called out many atrocities faced by the community.

His notable written works include the 1792 Charge and 1797 Charge. Hall's 1792 Charge focused on the abolition of slavery in his home state of Massachusetts. He addressed the importance of black leaders playing prominent roles in the shaping of the country and creation of unity. In his 1797 Charge, Hall wrote about the treatment and hostility that blacks received in the United States. He recognized black revolutionaries in the Haitian Revolution. Hall was one of several free blacks in Massachusetts who presented a petition to the legislature in 1788 protesting African-American seamen being sold into slavery.

In a speech he presented in June 1797, Hall said:
Patience, I say; for were we not possessed of a great measure of it, we could not bear up under the daily insults we meet with in the streets of Boston, much more on public days of recreation. How, at such times, are we shamefully abused, and that to such a degree, that we may truly be said to carry our lives in our hands, and the arrows of death are flying about our heads. ...tis not for want of courage in you, for they know that they dare not face you man for man, but in a mob.

Back to Africa movement 
Prince Hall was involved in the Back-to-Africa movement and approached the legislature to request funds for voluntary emigration to Africa. In January 1773, Prince Hall and seventy three other African-American delegates presented an emigration plea to the Massachusetts Senate. This plea, which included the contentions that African Americans are better suited to Africa's climate and lifestyle, failed. When a group of freed black men had begun a trip to Africa, they were captured and held, which reignited Hall's interest in the movement. He found that there was not sufficient momentum and support for the Back-to-Africa movement to make it a reality at the time.

Copp's Hill Burying Ground 
Prince Hall died in 1807  and is buried in Copp's Hill Burying Ground in Boston along with other notable Bostonians from the colonial era. Thousands of other African Americans who lived in the "New Guinea" community at the base of Copp's Hill are buried alongside Snowhill Street in unmarked graves.

A tribute monument was erected in Copp's Hill on June 24, 1835, in his name next to his grave marker. The inscription reads: "Here lies ye body of Prince Hall, first Grand Master of the colored Grand Lodge in Mass. Died Dec. 7, 1807" According to biographer David Gray, newspaper accounts showed that Hall died on December 4 and was buried three days later. His wife, Sylvia (Zilpha) Ward Hall, was the executrix of his estate, which amounted to $47.22, and there was no realty.

Notes

References

Further reading 
 Allen,  Danielle.  “A Forgotten Black Founding Father: Why I’ve Made It My Mission to Teach Others about Prince Hall,” Atlantic (March 2021), online.
 Draffen of Newington, George (May 13, 1976).  Prince Hall Freemasonry.  Scotland: The Phylaxis Society.  Reprinted at Phylaxis Society: Prince Hall Freemasonry.
 
 Edward, Bruce John (June 5, 1921).  Prince Hall, the Pioneer of Negro Masonry.  Proofs of the Legitimacy of Prince Hall Masonry.   New York.
 Freemasons. Proceedings of the One Hundredth Anniversary of the Granting of Warrant 459 to African Lodge, at Boston ... Sept. 29, 1884, Under the Auspices of the M.W. Prince Hall Grand Lodge F. and A. Masons. Boston: Franklin Press, 1885.
 Gray, David L. (2004).  Inside Prince Hall (North American Edition) Lancaster VA: Anchor Communications LLC. 
 Haunch, T.O.  (Commentary on the illegitimacy of alleged Provincial Grand Master patent.)  Phylaxis Society: Reviews of Prince Hall Freemasonry (retrieved December 29, 2004).
 Kearse, Gregory S., "The Bucks of America & Prince Hall Freemasonry" Prince Hall Masonic Digest  Newspaper,  (Washington, D.C. 2012), 8.
 Kearse, Gregory S., "Prince Hall's Charge of 1792: An Assertion of African Heritage." Washington, D.C., Heredom, Vol. 20, 2012, Scottish Rite Research Society. 273–309.
 Moniot, Joseph E.  Prince Hall Lodges History—Legitimacy—Quest for recognition.  Proceedings, Vol. VI, No. 5, Walter F. Meier Lodge of Research No. 281, Grand Lodge of Washington.
 Roundtree, Alton G., and Paul M. Bessel (2006).  Out of the Shadows: Prince Hall Freemasonry in America, 200 Years of Endurance.  Forestville MD: KLR Publishing. 
 Walkes, Jr., Joseph A (1979).  Black Square and Compass—200 years of Prince Hall Freemasonry, p. 8.  Richmond, Virginia: Macoy Publishing & Masonic Supply Co.
 Wesley, Dr. Charles H (1977).  Prince Hall: Life and Legacy.  Washington, DC: The United Supreme Council, Southern Jurisdiction, Prince Hall Affiliation and the Afro-American Historical and Cultural Museum.  Reprinted in Prince Hall Masonic Directory, 4th Edition (1992).  Conference of Grand Masters, Prince Hall Masons.

External links 

 Massachusetts Historical Society Search for "Prince Hall" documents.

1738 births
1807 deaths
18th-century American slaves
Abolitionists from Boston
African-American abolitionists
African Americans in the American Revolution
American pan-Africanists
American people of English descent
Black Patriots
Burials in Boston
People from colonial Boston
People of colonial Massachusetts
People of Massachusetts in the American Revolution
People from Bridgetown